Kaemis is a genus of  woodlouse hunting spiders that was first described by Christa L. Deeleman-Reinhold in 1993.

Species
 it contains five species:
Kaemis aeruginosus (Barrientos, Espuny & Ascaso, 1994) – Spain
Kaemis carnicus Gasparo, 1995 – Italy
Kaemis circe (Brignoli, 1975) – Italy
Kaemis gasparoi Mazzoleni & Pantini, 2018 – Italy
Kaemis vernalis Deeleman-Reinhold, 1993 (type) – Montenegro

References

Araneomorphae genera
Dysderidae